Hisila: from Revolutionary to First Lady is a 2021 memoir by Nepalese politician Hisila Yami. It was published by Penguin Random House.

Synopsis 
The book contains chronicles of her life, from being born in a Newar family, being a student in India, meeting and marrying Baburam Bhattarai, becoming a Maoist revolutionary, wife of Bhattarai, and being a mother. Hisila: from Revolutionary to First Lady received mixed reviews from critics. The Record said that this book can be useful  for "those interested in the social sciences, especially gender and social inclusion, and the history and political economy of the Nepali civil war".

See Also 

 Singha Durbarko Ghumne Mech
 Forget Kathmandu
 The Nepal Nexus
 All Roads Lead North

References

External links 

 Hisila: from Revolutionary to First Lady on Goodreads

2021 non-fiction books
21st-century Nepalese books
Books about Nepal
Nepalese non-fiction books
Political books
Works about the Nepalese Civil War
Nepalese biographies
English books by Nepalese writer
Nepalese literature in English